Yuki Bhambri and Divij Sharan are the defending champions, but chose not to participate.

Seeds

Draw

References
 Main Draw

Shanghai Challenger - Doubles
2015 Doubles